James Haas Scheuer (February 6, 1920 – August 30, 2005) was a Democratic member of the United States House of Representatives from New York. He was also affiliated with the Liberal Party of New York.

Family and education
Scheuer was born and raised in New York City, where he attended the Ethical Culture Fieldston School. He received a bachelor's degree from Swarthmore College in 1942, a master's degree from Harvard Business School in 1943, and a law degree from Columbia University Law School in 1948.

His brothers were Richard J. Scheuer, a scholar and philanthropist, Walter Scheuer, an investor and documentary-maker, and Steven H. Scheuer, a television and film critic. His sister is Amy Scheuer Cohen of Larchmont, NY. He was married in 1948 to interior designer Emily Malino (1925–2007) and had four children. Scheuer contracted polio while on his honeymoon, and recuperated for a year at President Franklin D. Roosevelt's  Warm Springs facility in Georgia. He walked with a cane for the rest of his life.

Early career
Scheuer served in the United States Army from 1943 until 1945. After returning home, he was hired by the Foreign Economic Administration, and in 1951 he became employed by the Office of Price Stabilization.

Political career
After an unsuccessful run for the House in 1962, Scheuer was elected to Congress in 1964. He originally served from January 3, 1965, until January 3, 1973.   He also headed the National Housing Conference.

Scheuer was an early and outspoken opponent of the Vietnam War and opposed governmental interference in private matters such as contraception and abortion.  A strong liberal, he supported legislation for the Head Start early education program, environmental protection and automotive safety. He also was a staunch supporter of Israel and the cause of Soviet Jews. He introduced a bill (HR 10638) to "provide for the establishment of the Negro History Museum Commission." He was "the first high-ranking American official to meet with refuseniks"  and in 1972  was detained and then expelled from the Soviet Union for  meeting  with Jews who were trying to emigrate from that country.

Scheuer ran for Mayor of New York City in 1969, but finished last in a field of five in the Democratic primary.

Population loss in the Bronx and redistricting in 1970 and again in 1972 pitted Scheuer against two other incumbent Congressmen in succession.  In 1970 he defeated Representative Jacob H. Gilbert, but two years later he was defeated by Representative  Jonathan Bingham.

Scheuer ran for Congress once again in 1974, moving to Neponsit, Queens in a different New York City district to succeed retiring Democrat Frank J. Brasco, who represented parts of south Queens and Brooklyn. He served his second stint as Representative from January 3, 1975, until January 3, 1993. In the 1980 Census his district was once again eliminated and he again moved to an open seat, this time based in Northeast Queens.

Later life
Following his retirement, he served as the United States Director of the European Bank for Reconstruction and Development from 1994 until 1996.

Scheuer died of heart and kidney failure at age 85.

See also
 List of Jewish members of the United States Congress

References

External links

1920 births
2005 deaths
Harvard Business School alumni
Columbia Law School alumni
Swarthmore College alumni
Ethical Culture Fieldston School alumni
Jewish members of the United States House of Representatives
People from Manhattan
United States Army soldiers
Public officeholders of Rockaway, Queens
Democratic Party members of the United States House of Representatives from New York (state)
20th-century American politicians